The 2002 Karl Schäfer Memorial (also known as the Vienna Cup) took place from October 15 through 19, 2002. Skaters competed in the disciplines of men's singles, ladies' singles, and ice dancing.

Results

Men

Ladies

Ice dancing

External links
 results

Karl Schäfer Memorial
Karl Schafer Memorial
Karl Schafer Memorial